Syllitus spinosus is a species of beetle in the family Cerambycidae. It was described by Gahan in 1915.

References

Stenoderini
Beetles described in 1915